Pancho Tequila (Spanish: El Bronco de Caborca) is a 1970 Mexican comedy western film directed by Miguel M. Delgado and written by Luis Alcoriza. It stars Alberto Vázquez.

Cast

 Alberto Vázquez
 María Duval
 Víctor Junco
 Alejandro Reyna
 Manuel Alvarado
 Carlos Nieto
 Juan Garza
 Carlos Cardán
 Mónica Serna
 Quintín Bulnes
 Ana Beatriz Amelio
 Jesús Casillas
 José Luis Caro	
 Federico González
 Regino Herrera

Reception

References

External links
 

1970 films
1970s Spanish-language films
1970s Western (genre) comedy films
Mexican Western (genre) comedy films
1970 comedy films
Films directed by Miguel M. Delgado
1970s Mexican films